Mark Fridrikhovich Ermler (5 May 193214 April 2002) was a Russian conductor.

Biography
Mark Ermler was born in Leningrad in 1932. His parents were Vera Bakun, a film set designer, and Fridrikh Ermler, a film director. He began to study piano at age 5.

His first conducting appearance at the Bolshoi Theatre was in a 1957 production of Cavalleria rusticana. His other noted operatic engagements included conducting the first performances of Sergei Prokofiev's last opera, The Story of a Real Man.

Ermler was especially noted for his conducting of ballets. He conducted, among others, Swan Lake, Petrushka, The Firebird, The Sleeping Beauty, and The Nutcracker.  He made complete recordings of all three of Tchaikovsky's ballets and Prokofiev's Romeo and Juliet with the orchestra of the Royal Opera House, Covent Garden. He became principal guest conductor of the Royal Ballet, London, in 1985.

Ermler died after a rehearsal with the Seoul Philharmonic Orchestra. His wife Dina and daughter Masha survived him.

Selected recordings
 Prokofiev – The Story of a Real Man. Bolshoi, 1961. reissued Chandos.
 Prokofiev – Symphony nr 5. Academic symphony orchestra of the Sovjet-Union Melodia. 33C10-09945-6. (LP)

References

External links 
 Obituary

See also 
 Ermler

1932 births
2002 deaths
Russian Jews
Musicians from Saint Petersburg
20th-century Russian conductors (music)
Russian male conductors (music)
20th-century Russian male musicians
21st-century Russian conductors (music)
21st-century Russian male musicians